The 2019 Tendring District Council election took place on 2 May 2019 to elect members of Tendring District Council in England. This was on the same day as other local elections.

Following the 2015 election the size of the council was reduced from 60 seats to 48 seats with ward boundaries being redrawn accordingly. These changes took effect from this election.

Summary

Election result

|-

Ward results

Alresford & Elmstead

Ardleigh & Little Bromley

Bluehouse

Brightlingsea

Burrsville

Cann Hall

Coppins

Dovercourt All Saints

Dovercourt Bay

Dovercourt Tollgate

Dovercourt Vines & Parkeston

Eastcliff

Frinton

Harwich and Kingsway

Homelands

Kirby Cross

Kirby-le-Soken & Hamford

Lawford, Manningtree & Mistley

Little Clacton

Pier

St. Bartholomew's

St. James

St. John's

St. Osyth's

Due to the death of a candidate, the election for St. Osyth's ward was delayed to 23 May 2019.

St. Paul's

Stour Valley

The Bentleys & Frating

The Oakleys & Wix

Thorpe, Beaumont & Great Holland

Walton

Weeley and Tendring

West Clacton & Jaywick Sands

By-elections

Eastcliff

West Clacton and Jaywick Sands

References

2019 English local elections
May 2019 events in the United Kingdom
2019
2010s in Essex